Below is the list of historical parties in Turkey. In this list, the parties that merged to create another party are also shown. Parties that were closed by the military rule in 1981 and continued with the same name afterwards are not shown. 

Parties, historical
 
Historical